Andrew Henry Embler (June 29, 1834 – July 28, 1918) was an officer in the Union Army during the American Civil War.  He received the country's highest award for bravery during combat, the Medal of Honor, for his action during the Battle of Boydton Plank Road in Virginia on October 27, 1864.  He would later serve as the Connecticut Adjutant General for two years.

Military career
Andrew H. Embler was born in Montgomery, New York, on June 29, 1834. He enlisted into the 71st New York State Militia eight days after the Battle of Fort Sumter.  He was commissioned as a first lieutenant into Company H.  He was wounded in the hip during the Battle of First Bull Run on July 21, 1861.  After recovering from his injury, he was appointed as captain and commander of Company E, 82nd New York Volunteer Infantry on December 5, 1861.  As the unit commander, he led the unit at the Battle of Antietam, being wounded again on September 17, 1862.

Battle of Boydton Plank Road

During the Siege of Petersburg, Virginia, in October 1864, the Union Army sought to seize a critical supply line for the Confederate Army – Boydton Plank Road.  Captain Embler was now commander of Company D of the 59th New York Volunteer Infantry which was a key unit during the battle.  Captain Embler led his unit as the spearhead of two regiments that attacked the Confederate's main body and allowed the Union to establish a barricade on the road.  The Union Army, under Major General Winfield S. Hancock, would achieve a tactical victory of the Confederate Army before both sides would settle down for the winter.  For these actions, Captain Embler would be awarded the Medal of Honor.

Captain Embler would continue to serve in the Union Army throughout the duration of the war and was present at Appomattox Court House in April 1865 to witness the surrender of the Confederate Army.  For his service, he was brevetted to the rank of lieutenant colonel.

Medal of Honor citation

After the War
Andrew returned to Montgomery, New York, after the war but would soon move to Connecticut to seek business opportunities.  In 1878 he was one of the founders of the District Telephone Company of New Haven, which would become Southern New England Telephone.  In 1877 he joined the First Company Governor's Foot Guard to which he served as the Major Commandant from February 28, 1881, to January 30, 1882.  Now a respected businessman and war hero, Governor Morgan Bulkeley appointed him to the position of adjutant general on January 10, 1890, and the rank of major general.

Personal life
Andrew married Maria Elanora Dickerson (July 11, 1839 – August 8, 1927) of Minisink Ford, New York.  Around June 1918, General Embler attended a memorial service for members of the Old New Haven Blues who had fallen in France during World War I.  It is suspected that he contracted pneumonia during this event and combined with weakening health, he died on July 28 at the age of 84. His wife remained in New Haven and would live another nine years, living to the age of 88.  Both are interred at the Evergreen Cemetery in New Haven.

References

1834 births
1918 deaths
Union Army officers
Connecticut Adjutant Generals
Military personnel from Connecticut
People of New York (state) in the American Civil War
United States Army Medal of Honor recipients
American Civil War recipients of the Medal of Honor
People from Montgomery, New York